Edward Collins Woodbridge (18 September 1794 in Bloomsbury, Middlesex – 11 February 1863 in Paddington, London) was an English amateur cricketer who made 10 known appearances in first-class cricket matches from 1815 until 1819.  He was the elder brother of Frederick Woodbridge.

Career
Edward Woodbridge was mainly associated with Surrey.

References

External sources
 CricketArchive record

1794 births
1863 deaths
English cricketers
English cricketers of 1787 to 1825
Surrey cricketers
People from Bloomsbury
People educated at Eton College
Sussex cricketers
Epsom cricketers
Non-international England cricketers
Old Etonians cricketers